Theo Jack Widdrington (born 6 April 1999) is an English professional footballer who plays for King's Lynn Town as a midfielder.

Early and personal life
Born in Southampton, Widdrington is the son of Tommy Widdrington. He is the brother of professional dancer Kai Widdrington.

Career
Widdrington began his career with Portsmouth, turning professional in 2017. He was released in April 2018 after 13 years with the club, having spent time earlier that season on loan at Havant & Waterlooville.

He signed for Bristol Rovers in July 2018.

He made his debut on 13 November 2018 in the EFL Trophy, one of four Bristol Rovers players (alongside Tareiq Holmes-Dennis, Zain Walker and Connor Jones) to do so in that match. On 21 December 2018 he moved on loan to Bognor Regis Town for one month. On 8 February 2019, he was loaned out to the same club once again, also for one month this time. On 11 March it was announced, that the loan deal had been extended for the rest of the season. On 13 April, Widdrington broke his wrist and missed the rest of the season.

In September 2019 he moved on loan to Welling United, and to Hemel Hempstead Town in March 2020.

He was released by Bristol Rovers at the end of the 2019–20 season.

On 31 August 2020 he signed for Lewes. He then moved to former club Havant & Waterlooville two weeks later.

He moved on loan to Gosport Borough in September 2021. He scored two goals in a match later that month. 

On 23 December 2021, Widdrington joined King's Lynn Town on loan until the end of January, the club managed by his father. The loan was made permanent in early 2022. His first goal for the club came when he scored the only goal as Lynn defeated high-flying Bromley to keep their survival hopes alive. On 30 June 2022, Widdrington signed a one-year contract extension with the club following their relegation to the National League North.

References

1999 births
Living people
Footballers from Southampton
English footballers
Portsmouth F.C. players
Havant & Waterlooville F.C. players
Bristol Rovers F.C. players
Bognor Regis Town F.C. players
Welling United F.C. players
Hemel Hempstead Town F.C. players
Lewes F.C. players
Gosport Borough F.C. players
King's Lynn Town F.C. players
National League (English football) players
Isthmian League players
Association football midfielders